Böllat is a mountain of Baden-Württemberg, Germany. It is located near Burgfelden, which belongs to Albstadt in Zollernalbkreis

Mountains and hills of Baden-Württemberg
Albstadt

de:Burgfelden#Geographie